Teucrodoxa is a genus of moth in the family Lecithoceridae.

Species
 Teucrodoxa monetella (Felder & Rogenhofer, 1875)
 Teucrodoxa spiculifera (Meyrick, 1918)

References

Natural History Museum Lepidoptera genus database

Lecithocerinae
Moth genera